Ní Dochartaigh is a surname. Notable people with the surname include:

 Kerri ní Dochartaigh (born 1983), Northern Irish writer
 Fionnghuala Ní Dochartaigh (died 1440), listed bearer of the name Fionnghuala

Surnames of Irish origin